Rush'n Attack: Ex-Patriot is a platform game, a sequel to the 1985 game Rush'n Attack. It was developed by Vatra Games and published by Konami. The game follows Sergeant Sid Morrow, an American special agent sent with his team to recover a prisoner from a secret Russian military base.

Gameplay

Rush'n Attack: Ex-Patriot is inspired by many of the action gameplay elements from the original Rush'n Attack. The game is played from a 2.5D perspective, with players being able to move horizontally and vertically. The game has several new features over its predecessor such as non-linear levels, stealth-based combat, attack combos and usable equipment such as gas masks and night vision goggles. Associate Producer James Wong stated in an interview that the original game was "wave after wave of enemies" and that the development team sought to "go a little deeper" while retaining the "pick up and play nature of the original game." The game spans three large levels that are traversed both horizontally and vertically.

The player character is initially armed only with a knife, but can pick up other temporary-use weaponry such as grenades, rifles and rocket launchers. The game sometimes requires the player character to use stealth to avoid enemy units or security cameras. Triggering any alarm will result in nearby enemies rushing to the source of the alarm trigger. Alarms can by triggered by making too much noise or by being noticed by one of the security cameras within the game's setting. In a departure from Rush'n Attack, the player character is given a health bar instead of the original one hit death.

Shank combos are the primary way in which players can earn points. The combat system is based on systema, a Russian martial art. As the character progresses new combos can be unlocked. Chaining combos together will result in the player gaining more points earned. The character can also dispatch enemies using stealth tactics. Generally stealth kills reward the player with a higher score. Stealth kills can be performed by hiding in dark areas or by entering dark doorways, then exiting for the kill as an enemy passes.

Plot
Rush'n Attack: Ex-Patriot takes place fifteen years after the Cold War struggle between Russia and the United States. During a flashback the player watches as the Central Intelligence Agency (CIA) learns that the Russians have discovered a previously unknown material called Ulyssium that could be used to create the world's most powerful nuclear missiles. To combat the threat they form Harvest, a secret CIA task force designed to investigate and infiltrate the Soviet weapons program. The Cold War ends without confrontation, and the team is extracted from Russia, save for one member. Fifteen years later new Harvest operative Sgt. Sid Morrow, callsign Wolf Spider, is sent with a team on Operation: Angel Tear to retrieve original Harvest team member Rory Gibson, who had been abandoned in Russia during the extraction. Having received intelligence that the missile program may have been re-initiated, the CIA also tasks Wolf Spider with re-evaluating the missile threat, sabotaging it if necessary.

Development
Rush'n Attack: Ex-Patriot was revealed by Konami on April 12, 2010 at Konami Gamers Night. It is the sequel to Rush n Attack. It was developed by Vatra Games and published by Konami. It is powered by Epic Games' Unreal Engine 3. During E3 2010 Ex-Patriot Associate Producer James Wong said that the team wanted to "retain the fun and quick pick up and play nature of the original game, but there is a little more depth. Wong revealed that scores would be posted to online leaderboards. He estimated gameplay time at 6-8 hours. Ex-Patriot uses the Unreal Engine 3.

Reception

Prior to its release, Rush'n Attack: Ex-Patriot drew comparisons to Shadow Complex and Bionic Commando Rearmed by the media. On release, the Xbox 360 version received "mixed" reviews, while the PlayStation 3 version received "generally unfavorable reviews", according to the review aggregation website Metacritic.

Arthur Gies of IGN was disappointed with the game. In his review he began simply with "Let's get straight to the point: Rush 'n Attack: Ex-Patriot is not a good game." He stated that the game "plays badly, it looks dated, and its design is uninspired and boring." Several reviewers said that the game attempts the metroidvania formula of open exploration, but fails due to its linearity.

Sales data during the game's first week revealed that only 652 players had scores on the game's leaderboard, the lowest opening week for any game in the month of March 2011. In contrast the next highest game, Strania, had 3,250 players posted to their leaderboards, while the highest opener, Beyond Good & Evil HD, posted 41,629 players.

Notes

References

External links
 

2011 video games
Action video games
Metroidvania games
Konami games
Platform games
PlayStation 3 games
PlayStation Network games
Side-scrolling video games
Single-player video games
Stealth video games
Unreal Engine games
Video game sequels
Video games about ninja
Video games developed in the Czech Republic
Video games with 2.5D graphics
Xbox 360 games
Xbox 360 Live Arcade games